The Honda CR85R is a racing motorcycle by Honda with a two-stroke engine. It was discontinued in 2007 and replaced with the CRF150R four-stroke bike.

The CR85R Expert variant has larger wheels and a longer swingarm. It therefore has a higher ground clearance and seat height. The CR85R Expert cannot race in the regular  class in the AMA.

References

External links
 Motorcycle USA website
 Motorcycle Daily 
 2007 Honda CR85R/CR85R-Expert: Specifications

CR85R Expert
Racing motorcycles
Two-stroke motorcycles